Sharon Veronica LaFraniere (born June 15, 1955) is an American journalist at The New York Times.

Early life 
LaFraniere was born in Detroit, Michigan. Her father was a car salesman, her mother was a homemaker. In 1973, she graduated from The Roeper School in Bloomfield Hills, Michigan, a private school for gifted children that awarded her an academic scholarship.  During high school, she held a variety of jobs, including at a gas station, a pancake house, a grocery store and Kentucky Fried Chicken, where she worked as an assistant manager. While in high school, she lived a year with Nora Barron, a psychiatric social worker at The Roeper School, her husband Guy Barron, and their two children.

Education 
In 1977, after she was granted a full academic scholarship, LaFraniere earned a Bachelor of Arts degree in comparative literature, graduating magna cum laude and with honors from Brown University in Providence, Rhode Island. She earned a Master of Science degree in 1979 in journalism from Northwestern University in Evanston, Illinois.

Career 
LaFraniere began her journalism career at The Louisville Times.  In 1983, LaFraniere became a reporter for The Washington Post. At both papers, she won prizes for local reporting. 
In 1998, LaFraniere became a foreign correspondent based in Moscow for The Washington Post. Her assignments took her into conflict zones in Afghanistan and on at least six occasions, in Chechnya.

In 2003, LaFraniere joined The New York Times, based in Johannesburg. Her series on the struggles of women in Africa won the Michael Kelly Award in 2006.

She moved to Beijing in 2008 to cover China for The New York Times, sharing the 2013 Gerald Loeb Award for International for "China's Secret Fortunes". She joined the newspaper's investigative unit in New York in late 2012.

In January 2017, she moved to Washington D.C. to join an investigative team formed to cover the Trump administration. She and her colleagues won a Pulitzer Prize in 2018 for their investigative reporting on the Trump team's links to Russia.  
In mid-2020, Ms. LaFraniere shifted to coverage of the Covid-19 pandemic from the Washington bureau.

In 2021, she and her colleagues were Pulitzer Prize finalists for their 2020 coverage of the Trump administration's failed response to the COVID-19 pandemic.

She was also a member of the team that won the prize for breaking news from The Association for Business Journalists for their coverage of the Food and Drug Administration's approval of the coronavirus vaccine developed by Pfizer-BioNTech.

Awards
 1999 Overseas Press Club Award for business reporting.
 2006 Michael Kelly Award.
 2013 Gerald Loeb Award for International for "China's Secret Fortunes".
 2018 Pulitzer Prize for National Reporting.
2021, finalist, Pulitzer Prize for National Reporting 
2021, winner, The Association for Business Journalists, for breaking news on the Covid-19 pandemic.

Personal life
LaFraniere's husband is Michael Wines, who is also a reporter for The New York Times. They have three grown children.

References

External links
 
 Sharon LaFraniere at muckrack.com
 Sharon LaFraniere at linkedin.com

1955 births
Living people
Writers from Detroit
Brown University alumni
Northwestern University alumni
Journalists from Michigan
The Washington Post people
The New York Times writers
American women journalists
20th-century American journalists
Gerald Loeb Award winners International
20th-century American women
21st-century American women